"Levels" is a song by Canadian rapper NorthSideBenji, featuring Houdini. It was released as a single on January 25, 2019. in which it speaks of the heart of getting out of their current circumstances and living a life of "Caviar Dreams". It was featured on his debut EP, "Caviar Dreams".

Track listing

Certifications

References

2019 songs
2019 singles
NorthSideBenji songs